The discography of American country music artist Charley Pride contains 75 singles, one other charting song, two promotional singles, one featured single and 11 music videos. Pride signed his first recording contract with RCA Victor in 1966. His first two singles failed to become hits. His third single, "Just Between You and Me," became a hit when it reached the top ten of the country charts. Pride had several more top ten hits over the next several years until he had first chart-topper in 1969. The single, "All I Have to Offer You (Is Me)," reached number one on the Billboard Hot Country Songs chart and spent 17 weeks charting. This was followed by five more number one hits, including "Is Anybody Goin' to San Antone." All of these singles also reached low-end positions on the Billboard Hot 100. 

In 1971, "Kiss an Angel Good Mornin'" not only topped the country chart, but also climbed to number 21 on the Hot 100 and number seven on the adult contemporary chart. Pride had further success with more number one country hits: "It's Gonna Take a Little Bit Longer," "She's Too Good to Be True," "A Shoulder to Cry On," "Then Who Am I," "Don't Fight the Feelings of Love," "Amazing Love," "Then Who Am I" and "Hope You're Feelin' Me (Like I'm Feelin' You)." He shifted his musical approach towards a more country pop style in the second half of the 70s and continued having number one hits. In total, Pride had seven more singles that topped the Billboard country songs chart between 1976 and 1979. This included "Someone Loves You Honey" and "You're My Jamaica." 

Pride remained with RCA Records into the early 1980s and had more hits with new songs and covers of former hits. Examples included "Honky Tonk Blues," "Mountain of Love" and "Night Games." Pride's chart success declined beginning in 1984 and then left RCA in 1986 for the smaller 16th Avenue label. In 1988, he had a number five country hit with "Shouldn't It Be Easier Than This." His 1990 single, "Amy's Eyes," would be his final charting single, peaking at number 28 on the country chart. Pride continued releasing singles sporadically until his death in 2020.

Singles

1960s

1970s

1980s–2010s

Guest singles

Promotional singles

Other charted songs

Music videos

Notes

References

External links
 Charley Pride music at his official website

Country music discographies
Discographies of American artists